Gist is the surname of:
 Carole Gist (born 1969), first African American woman to win the Miss USA title
 Christopher Gist (1706–1759), one of the first white explorers of the Ohio Country in what would become the United States
 George Gist, English name of Sequoyah (c.1770–1843), Native American silversmith and inventor of a Cherokee syllabary
 James Gist (born 1986), American professional basketball player
 Joseph Gist (1775–1836), U.S. Representative from South Carolina
 Kenneth Gist Jr. (1946–2018), birth name of Kenny O'Dell, American country music singer and songwriter.
 Mordecai Gist (1743–1792), Continental Army general during the American Revolutionary War
 Nathaniel Gist (1733-1812?), American colonel in the American Revolutionary War, reputed father of the Native American leader Sequoyah, son of Christopher Gist
 Robert Gist (1924–1998), American actor and film director
 Samuel Gist (1717 or 1723-1815), English-born colonial Virginia slave owner who made provisions to free his slaves in his will
 States Rights Gist (1831–1864), lawyer, militia general and Confederate Army general in the American Civil War
 William Henry Gist (1807–1874), 68th Governor of South Carolina and a leader of the secession movement in South Carolina